The Köping–Uttersberg–Riddarhyttan Railway (Swedish: Köping-Uttersberg-Riddarhyttans Järnväg or KURJ) was a narrow-gauge railway in central Sweden,  long. The railway ran northwest from the port city of Köping to several small industry cities such as Uttersberg and Riddarhyttan. The line operated between 1864 and 1968.

Construction

Gauge incompatibility
When the locomotives and rolling stock were ordered, however, there was an error – possibly confusion between the Swedish fot and the English foot, which differ by about 2.7%, or more likely because Köping–Uttersbergs järnvägsaktiebolag assumed the gauge was measured from the centre of the rail to the centre of the rail.

It was only when the rolling stock was delivered that the error was noticed. It was decided that moving one rail outwards on the half-built railway would be cheaper than re-gauging the vehicles.

Operation
Freight traffic started on the part-opened line in 1864, and in 1866, the full  of the Köping-Uttersberg Railway was officially Opened. In 1880 a new  line, the Uttersberg-Riddarhyttan Railway was built by another company, but to the same gauge. This was purchased by the Köping-Uttersberg Company in 1911, and the combined railway became the Köping–Uttersberg–Riddarhyttan Railway.

Closure
Passenger traffic ended in 1952, although a freight service continued until 1968, after which all the track was removed.

See also 

 List of Swedish narrow gauges.

References

External links 

 The Railway – KURJ
 KURJ, Köping–Uttersbergs–Riddarhyttans Järnväg 

Narrow gauge railways in Sweden
Railway lines opened in 1864
3 ft 7 in gauge railways